Naval Air Station Corpus Christi  is a United States Navy naval air base located six miles (10 km) southeast of the central business district (CBD) of Corpus Christi, in Nueces County, Texas.

History
A naval air station for Corpus Christi had been proposed since the mid-1930s, and the city's congressman, Richard M. Kleberg, supported it. But it remained a low priority construction project for the U.S. Navy as late as January 9, 1940.  (The Kleberg family and Roy Miller both supported Vice President John Nance Garner's quest for the 1940 presidential nomination.)  Rep. Lyndon B. Johnson made himself a key Texas ally of President Franklin D. Roosevelt's bid for a third term, and the White House told the Navy Department to consult Johnson, and heed his advice, on Navy contracts in Texas.  By February 1940, the project was on the Navy's preferred list. Brown & Root, a Houston firm, shared the construction contract with another New Deal supporter, Henry Kaiser; the president personally signed the (first) cost plus fixed fee contract June 13, 1940.  The Roosevelt campaign in Texas no longer had a shortage of cash.

The official step leading to the construction of the Naval Air Station was initiated by the 75th United States Congress in 1938. A board found that a lack of training facilities capable of meeting an emergency demand for pilots constituted a grave situation. They recommended the establishment of a second air training station, and further, that it be located on Corpus Christi Bay. NAS Corpus Christi was commissioned by its first Commanding Officer, CAPT Alva Berhard, on March 12, 1941. The first flight training started on May 5, 1941.

In 1941, 800 instructors provided training for more than 300 student pilots a month. The training rate nearly doubled after the bombing of Pearl Harbor. By the end of World War II, more than 35,000 naval aviators had earned their wings there. Corpus Christi provided intermediate flight training in World War II, training naval pilots to fly SNJ, SNV, SNB, OS2U, PBY, and N3N type airplanes. In 1944 it was the largest naval aviation training facility in the world. The facility covered , and had 997 hangars, shops, barracks, warehouses and other buildings.

Future President George H. W. Bush was the youngest pilot to receive his wings at NAS Corpus Christi in June 1943. NAS Corpus Christi also was home to the Blue Angels from 1951 to 1954. It also served as a Project Mercury Tracking station in the early 1960s.

2020 shooting
On May 21, 2020, a motorist crashed through a northern perimeter gate at NAS Corpus Christi, activating vehicle barriers that stopped the vehicle. The driver then got out and opened fire before being shot and killed. A Navy police officer was shot but was protected by a ballistic vest. Officials with the FBI announced the incident was terrorism-related and a second person of interest may be at large. The shooter was later identified as Adam Alsalhi, a 20-year-old Corpus Christi resident born in Syria, who had expressed support for ISIS and Al-Qaeda in the Arabian Peninsula. The incident was the second fatal shooting and the fourth security incident that caused NAS Corpus Christi to be locked down since February 2019.

Current operations
Today, the Naval Aviator training program at NAS Corpus Christi is much longer, approximately 18 months, due to the increased complexity of today's aircraft. Currently, Training Air Wing FOUR produces approximately 400 newly qualified aviators each year via the "Maritime Pipeline" for shore-based U.S. Navy, U.S. Marine Corps and U.S. Coast Guard fixed-wing jet and turboprop aircraft, as well as a limited number of NATO/Allied/Coalition military pilots for similar aircraft.

Training Air Wing FOUR consists of four squadrons. VT-27 and VT-28 handle primary training in the T-6B Texan II, a single engine turboprop aircraft. VT-31 and VT-35 provide advanced training in the twin engine T-44C Pegasus aircraft.

Other aircraft found at NAS Corpus Christi include the P-3 Orions and General Atomics MQ-9 Reaper drones operated by U.S. Customs and Border Protection.

In addition to U.S. Navy Student Naval Aviators, VT-31 and VT-35 also train Student Naval Aviators from the U.S. Marine Corps and U.S. Coast Guard. The station employs officer, enlisted and civilian personnel serving in the U.S. Navy, U.S. Marine Corps, U.S. Coast Guard, U.S. Army, U.S. Customs and Border Protection and the military services of numerous NATO/Allied/Coalition partner nations.

NAS Corpus Christi is also home to the Corpus Christi Army Depot (CCAD), the largest helicopter repair facility in the world and an unusual arrangement of an Army installation located on a Naval facility.

Units

Major Commands
Naval Air Training Command
Corpus Christi Army Depot
Coast Guard Air Station Corpus Christi

Wings
Training Air Wing FOUR (TW4)

Squadrons

Other Tenants
U.S. Navy Reserve Navy Operational Support Center (NOSC)
Naval Health Clinic Corpus Christi (NHCCC)
Fleet and Industrial Supply Center Jacksonville Det Corpus Christi (FISC JAX Det Corpus Christi)
Marine Aviation Training Support Group (MATSG)
U.S. Customs and Border Protection (CBP)

Facilities and service also located on the installation
Corpus Christi Army Depot
Coast Guard Air Station Corpus Christi
Commissary
DLA Distribution Corpus Christi, Texas
Naval Aviation Forecast Detachment Corpus Christi
Navy Lodge
Surveillance Support Center (SSC)
Veterinary Treatment Facility

See also 

 List of United States Navy airfields

References

External links

Corpus Christi, Naval Air Station
Military installations established in 1941
Military in Corpus Christi, Texas
Military installations in Texas
Buildings and structures in Nueces County, Texas
Populated coastal places in Texas
1941 establishments in Texas